In Greek mythology, Arcas (Ancient Greek: Ἀρκάς) was a hunter who became king of Arcadia. He was remembered for having taught people the arts of weaving and baking bread and for spreading agriculture to Arcadia.

Family 
Arcas was the son of Zeus and Callisto. He was married to either Laodamia (Leaneira), daughter of Amyclas of Sparta; Meganeira, daughter of Crocon; the nymph Chrysopeleia; or the Dryad Erato. He also left a number of children, including the sons Azan, Apheidas, Elatus, and Triphylus, an illegitimate son Autolaus and at least two daughters, Hyperippe and Diomeneia. Arcas's other sons were Erymanthus and Pelasgus.

Mythology 
Callisto was a nymph in the retinue of the goddess Artemis, or in some sources the daughter of King Lycaon. As she would not be with anyone but Artemis, Zeus cunningly disguised himself as Artemis and raped Callisto. The child resulting from their union was called Arcas.

Hera became jealous, and in anger, she transformed Callisto into a bear. She would have done the same or worse to her son, but Zeus hid Arcas in an area of Greece, which would come to be called Arcadia, in his honor. Arcas was given into a care of one of the Pleiades, Maia. There, Arcas safely lived until one day, during one of the court feasts held by king Lycaon (Arcas' maternal grandfather), Arcas was placed upon the burning altar as a sacrifice to the gods. He then said to Zeus, "If you think that you are so clever, make your son whole and un-harmed". Zeus became enraged and made Arcas whole and directed his anger toward Lycaon, turning him into the first werewolf.

Then, Arcas became the new king of Arcadia and the country's greatest hunter. One day, when Arcas went hunting in the woods, he came across his mother. Seeing her son after so long, she went forth to embrace him. Not knowing that the bear was his mother, he went to kill her with an arrow.  In one version of the story, Arcas hunted Callisto because she had entered the forbidden sanctuary of Zeus on Mt. Lykaion.  Zeus however, watching over them, stopped Arcas from shooting Callisto, and turned Arcas into a bear, then putting them into the stars. They are now referred to as Ursa Major and Ursa Minor, the big and little bears. When Hera heard of that, she became so angry that she asked Tethys to keep them in a certain place so that the constellations would never sink below the horizon and receive water. Arcas’ bones were brought to Arcadia and buried near an altar dedicated to Hera under the directions of Delphic Oracle.

Notes

References 

 Apollodorus, The Library with an English Translation by Sir James George Frazer, F.B.A., F.R.S. in 2 Volumes, Cambridge, MA, Harvard University Press; London, William Heinemann Ltd. 1921. ISBN 0-674-99135-4. Online version at the Perseus Digital Library. Greek text available from the same website.
Gaius Julius Hyginus, Fabulae from The Myths of Hyginus translated and edited by Mary Grant. University of Kansas Publications in Humanistic Studies. Online version at the Topos Text Project.
 Pausanias, Description of Greece with an English Translation by W.H.S. Jones, Litt.D., and H.A. Ormerod, M.A., in 4 Volumes. Cambridge, MA, Harvard University Press; London, William Heinemann Ltd. 1918. . Online version at the Perseus Digital Library
Pausanias, Graeciae Descriptio. 3 vols. Leipzig, Teubner. 1903.  Greek text available at the Perseus Digital Library.
 Publius Ovidius Naso, Fasti translated by James G. Frazer. Online version at the Topos Text Project.
 Publius Ovidius Naso, Fasti. Sir James George Frazer. London; Cambridge, MA. William Heinemann Ltd.; Harvard University Press. 1933. Latin text available at the Perseus Digital Library.
 Publius Ovidius Naso, Metamorphoses translated by Brookes More (1859-1942). Boston, Cornhill Publishing Co. 1922. Online version at the Perseus Digital Library.
 Publius Ovidius Naso, Metamorphoses. Hugo Magnus. Gotha (Germany). Friedr. Andr. Perthes. 1892. Latin text available at the Perseus Digital Library.

Children of Zeus
Demigods in classical mythology
Mythological kings of Arcadia
Kings in Greek mythology
Metamorphoses characters
Arcadian mythology
Deeds of Zeus
Metamorphoses into animals in Greek mythology
Ursa Minor (constellation)